Harry Bedford (1873 – 17 October 1939) was a British music hall comedian and singer.

Born in Pimlico, London, he made his first onstage appearance at the age of seven.  He was an apprentice in a boat-building business before becoming a professional entertainer in 1888, making his first appearances in pantomimes and minstrel shows.  By 1895 he had become a leading music hall entertainer, appearing at the Middlesex Music Hall in London and developing an act that was considered somewhat risqué for the time.  Described as a "low comedian", his popular songs (written by others) included "A Little Bit Off the Top", "The Cock of the North", and "When I Get Some Money".

Part of his act can be seen in the 1934 Will Hay film Those Were the Days.

He died in London in 1939.

References

External links

1873 births
1939 deaths
Music hall performers